= Nanobama =

Nanobama is the name of microminiature portraits of United States President Barack Obama. They were created by Professor John Hart of University of Michigan's Mechanical Engineering department to celebrate the election of Obama. The portrait, which considered the world's smallest presidential portrait, measures 500 μm across (about the size of a period in the average printed text).

The portrait is composed of some 150 million carbon nanotubes representing the number of people who voted for him in the 2009 presidential election. Each nanotube is 10,000 times smaller than a human hair. These were grown together on a silicon substrate, with the 3D artwork produced using photolithography. Hart actually created the portraits before the election's outcome was known, and he let the secret out to the world in early November 2008. There are several Nanobamas extant, but they all reside on a silicon wafer in the professor's office.

Aside from serving as homage to Obama, nanobama was also created to draw attention to the growing capabilities of nanotechnology. According to Hart, the nanotubes are the strongest molecule known to man and, although it has fantastic electrical and thermal properties, effective methods of organizing large numbers of these nanotubes are needed.
